Melvin D. Synhorst (January 21, 1914 – March 28, 1999) was the Iowa Secretary of State from 1949 to 1965 and from 1967 to 1980.  Elected on November 2, 1948, and on November 8, 1966, he was a native of Sioux County.  Serving for the two years between his terms was Gary L. Cameron.  Synhorst's second term ended at his resignation; he was replaced by Mary Jane Odell.  From 1959 to 1960, Synhorst was the president of the National Association of Secretaries of State.

References

External links
Melvin D. Synhorst at the Political Graveyard
Melvin D. Synhorst's obituary at the Herald Tribune

1914 births
1999 deaths
Iowa Republicans
People from Sioux County, Iowa
Secretaries of State of Iowa
20th-century American politicians